Battistini is an Italian surname. Notable people with the surname include:

Alfredo Battistini (1953–2008), Italian-Swiss sculptor, illustrator and athlete
Dillon Battistini (born 1977), English racing driver
Graziano Battistini (1936–1994), Italian cyclist
Graziano Battistini, (born 1970), retired Italian football goalkeeper
Manuel Battistini (born 1994), Sammarinese footballer 
Mattia Battistini (1856–1928), Italian opera singer
Maurizio Battistini (born 1957), Sammarinese alpine skier
Michael Battistini (born 1996), Sammarinese footballer
Sergio Battistini (born 1963), Italian footballer

See also
Battistini (Rome Metro), underground station in Rome, Italy

Italian-language surnames